Floyd Macon Simmons (April 10, 1923 – April 1, 2008) was an American athlete and actor who competed mainly in the decathlon. He was born in Charlotte, North Carolina.

Biography
Raised in Charlotte, Simmons was the son of a builder and former football coach of Davidson College.  Nicknamed "Chunk" by a nurse for his size when still a baby, Simmons played football for Central High School in Charlotte, North Carolina where he graduated in 1942.

During World War II he was wounded in action in Italy while serving with the 10th Mountain Division.

He competed for the United States in the 1948 Summer Olympics held in London, England in the decathlon where he won the bronze medal. He repeated this feat four years later in the 1952 Summer Olympics held in Helsinki, Finland, where he again won the bronze medal. He continued to compete in Masters athletics into his 80s.  He died in Charlotte, North Carolina.

In addition to competing in sports Simmons was contracted to Universal Pictures alongside Rock Hudson and John Gavin. Simmons guest starred in many television shows and  appeared in over a dozen films most memorably in South Pacific (1958). He was considered for the role of Brick in the film version of Cat on a Hot Tin Roof. as Allan Quatermain in Watusi and was signed to play Mr. Roberts in a Joshua Logan television series of the same name that was unmade.

Notes

External links
 
Floyd Simmons Obituary https://web.archive.org/web/20101126010007/http://masterstrack.com/2008/04/2528/

1923 births
2008 deaths
American male decathletes
Olympic bronze medalists for the United States in track and field
Athletes (track and field) at the 1948 Summer Olympics
Athletes (track and field) at the 1952 Summer Olympics
American male film actors
United States Army personnel of World War II
Medalists at the 1952 Summer Olympics
Medalists at the 1948 Summer Olympics
20th-century American male actors